Admiral Sir Richard Henry Peirse,  (4 September 1860 – 10 July 1940) was a senior Royal Navy officer during the First World War.

Naval career
Peirse joined the Royal Navy in 1873 and, in 1885, developed a new naval director which was to become the fire-control system used in all ships with large guns. Promoted to captain in 1900, he commanded  during the Second Boer War.

Promoted to rear admiral in February 1909, Peirse was appointed Commander-in-Chief, East Indies Station in 1913. Then promoted to vice admiral in October 1914, he served in the First World War taking part in the attack on Smyrna in 1915, where he outgunned the Turkish Fleet. He continued in his role on the East Indies Station until December 1915. He was promoted to admiral in March 1918.

After the war Peirse became Naval Member of the Central Committee of the Board of Invention and Research. He retired from the navy in January 1919.

Personal life
Peirse lived in Upper Norwood in London
and there is a memorial to him in Bedale Parish Church in North Yorkshire.

He and his wife lived for many years at Fiesole on Bathwick Hill in Bath, Somerset before moving to Belmont in Combe Down, where he died in 1940.

His son, Sir Richard Peirse, became air chief marshal.

Awards and decorations
  Knight Commander of the Order of the Bath – 22 June 1914
 Knight Commander of the Order of the British Empire – 7 June 1918
 Member of the Royal Victorian Order – 9 October 1903
 Legion of Honour, Grand officer (France) – 18 June 1918
 Order of the Nile, First Class (Egypt) – 25 October 1918

References

External links
Portrait painting of Admiral Sir R H Peirse by Frederic Whiting

1861 births
1940 deaths
Deputy Lieutenants of Somerset
Grand Officiers of the Légion d'honneur
Knights Commander of the Order of the Bath
Knights Commander of the Order of the British Empire
Members of the Royal Victorian Order
Royal Navy admirals of World War I
Royal Navy personnel of the Second Boer War
Military personnel from York